Shoreline is the shore.

Shoreline or Shore Line, or variant, may refer to:

Places
 Shoreline, Washington, USA; a city
 Shoreline Amphitheatre, Mountain View, California, USA; an outdoor amphitheater
 Shoreline School District, Washington (state), USA

Transport
 Shore Line Railway (disambiguation)
 Shoreline North/185th station, a light rail station in Shoreline, Washington, USA
 Shoreline South/148th station, a light rail station in Shoreline, Washington, USA
 Shore Line Trolley Museum, East Haven, Connecticut, USA

Other uses
 Shoreline Community College, Shoreline, Washington (state), USA
 Shoreline Entertainment, a California, USA film production company
 "7/4 (Shoreline)", a song by Broken Social Scene from the 2005 album Broken Social Scene

See also

 Shoreline Park (disambiguation)
 South Shore Line (disambiguation)
 North Shore Line (disambiguation)
 
 
 
 
 Shore (disambiguation)
 Line (disambiguation)